Incamyiopsis is a genus of parasitic flies in the family Tachinidae.

Species
Incamyiopsis imitatrix Townsend, 1919

Distribution
Peru.

References

Exoristinae
Diptera of South America
Tachinidae genera
Monotypic Brachycera genera
Taxa named by Charles Henry Tyler Townsend